Okaya may refer to:

Okaya & Co., Ltd., the oldest major Japanese trading company still in existence.
Okaya, Nagano, a city in Nagano Prefecture, Japan
Okaya Optical, the manufacturer of Lord cameras and Vista binoculars